Tim Murray was the Lieutenant Governor of Massachusetts.

Tim Murray may also refer to:

 Tim Murray (archaeologist) (born 1955), Australian archaeologist
 Tim Murray (ice hockey executive) (born 1963), former general manager for the Buffalo Sabres of the National Hockey League
 Tim Murray (ice hockey player) (born 1974), Canadian former ice hockey defenceman who starred with the New Hampshire Wildcats in the 1990s
 Tim Murray (rapper), American rapper
 Tim Murray (soccer) (born 1987), American soccer player